Marandeh Valley is a town and one of the beautiful valleys of Tehsil Torkhow, Khot Chitral District of Chitral District in the province of Pakistan. Khot Valley is located 129 km from the main city of Chitral. The language of Chitral, Khowar, originated from this area.

Populated places in Chitral District
Valleys of Khyber Pakhtunkhwa
Chitral District